Gargoyle Bastion is a rocky headland rising to 60 m on the northwest coast of Varna Peninsula, Livingston Island in the South Shetland Islands, Antarctica and forming the south side of the entrance to Hydra Cove and the northeast side of the entrance to Griffin Cove.  It has sub-vertical cliff faces to seaward, and is flanked to north and south by rock cliffs.

The feature is named after the mythical Gargoyle, a dragon-monster.

Location

Maps
 L.L. Ivanov et al. Antarctica: Livingston Island and Greenwich Island, South Shetland Islands. Scale 1:100000 topographic map. Sofia: Antarctic Place-names Commission of Bulgaria, 2005.
 L.L. Ivanov. Antarctica: Livingston Island and Greenwich, Robert, Snow and Smith Islands. Scale 1:120000 topographic map.  Troyan: Manfred Wörner Foundation, 2009.

References
Composite Antarctic Gazetteer.

Headlands of Livingston Island